The New South Wales Ministry of Health, branded NSW Health, is a ministerial department of the New South Wales Government. NSW Health supports the executive and statutory roles of the Minister for Health, the Minister for Regional Health, and the Minister for Mental Health. The Ministry also monitors the performance of state-wide health organisations that collectively make up NSW Health. It is primarily responsible for the public health system in New South Wales, particularly through public hospitals as well as associated agencies and statutory authorities, such as the NSW Ambulance service.

The provision or delivery of health services are delegated to sixteen local health districts, who provide services in a wide range of settings, from primary care posts in the remote outback to metropolitan tertiary health centres, including specialist networks that are focused on children's and paediatric services; custodial health and forensic mental health; and associated agencies.

Leadership 
The Ministry is led by its Secretary, Susan Pearce. The Secretary reports to the following Ministers: 
 Minister for Health, presently The Honourable Brad Hazzard 
 Minister for Women, the Minister for Regional Health, and the Minister for Mental Health, presently the Honourable Bronwyn Taylor .

Local Health Districts
Central Coast Local Health District
Far West Local Health District
Hunter New England Local Health District
Illawarra Shoalhaven Local Health District
Mid North Coast Local Health District
Murrumbidgee Local Health District
Nepean Blue Mountains Local Health District
Northern NSW Local Health District
Northern Sydney Local Health District
South Eastern Sydney Local Health District
South Western Sydney Local Health District
Southern NSW Local Health District
Sydney Local Health District
Western NSW Local Health District
Western Sydney Local Health District

Networks
Justice Health and Forensic Mental Health Network
St Vincent's Health Network
Sydney Children's Hospitals Network (Randwick and Westmead)

State-wide Health Services
 NSW Ambulance
 NSW Health Pathology 
 NSW Health Protection
 NSW Organ & Tissue Donation Service

Pillars
 Agency for Clinical Innovation 
 Bureau of Health Information
 Cancer Institute NSW
 Clinical Excellence Commission
 Health Education and Training Institute NSW (HETI)

Shared Services 
 HealthShare NSW
 eHealth NSW
 Health Infrastructure

Health Professional Councils
 Chinese Medicine Council of New South Wales
 Chiropractic Council of New South Wales
 Dental Council of New South Wales
 Medical Council of New South Wales
 Medical Radiation Practice Council of New South Wales
 Nursing and Midwifery Council of New South Wales
 Occupational Therapy Council of New South Wales
 Optometry Council of New South Wales
 Osteopathy Council of New South Wales
 Pharmacy Council of New South Wales
 Physiotherapy Council of New South Wales
 Podiatry Council of New South Wales
 Psychology Council of New South Wales

See also
Clinical Information Access Portal
Minister for Health (New South Wales)

References

External links

Health
Medical and health organisations based in New South Wales
1914 establishments in Australia
Health policy in Australia
New South Wales